Eublemma viettei is a species of moth of the family Erebidae. It is found in Ethiopia, Madagascar, Mauritius, Zimbabwe and in Réunion.

Its length is about 7–8 mm, with a wingspan of approx. 14–16 mm.

References

Moths described in 1954
Boletobiinae
Moths of Madagascar
Moths of Réunion
Moths of Sub-Saharan Africa
Moths of Mauritius
Lepidoptera of Ethiopia
Lepidoptera of Zimbabwe